Jeffrey Gale Williamson (born 1935) is the Laird Bell Professor of Economics (Emeritus), Harvard University; an Honorary Fellow in the Department of Economics at the University of Wisconsin (Madison); Research Associate at the National Bureau of Economic Research; and Research Fellow for the Center for Economic and Policy Research. He also served (1994–1995) as the president of the Economic History Association. His research focus is and has been on comparative economic history and the history of the international economy and development.  Economist Hilary Williamson Hoynes is his daughter.

Selected publications 
 with T. Hatton, 1998, The Age of Mass Migration, Oxford
 with P. Aghion, 1998, Growth, Inequality, and Globalization, Mattioli Lectures: Cambridge
 with K. O'Rourke, 1999, Globalization and History, MIT
 with M. Bordo and A. M. Taylor, 2003, Globalization in Historical Perspective, Chicago and NBER
 with Timothy J. Hatton, 2005, Global Migration and the World Economy. Two Centuries of Policy and Performance, The MIT Press.
 2011, Trade and Poverty: When the Third World Fell Behind.  Cambridge, MA: MIT Press.
 with Peter H. Lindert, 2016, Unequal Gains: American Growth and Inequality since 1700. Princeton University Press.

Festschrift 
T.J. Hatton. K. H. O'Rourke and A. M. Taylor (eds.), The New Comparative Economic History: Essays in Honor of Jeffrey G. Williamson, Cambridge Mass: MIT Press, 2007)

References

External links

Economic historians
American development economists
Living people
1935 births
Presidents of the Economic History Association